Aïn Fares is a town and commune in M'Sila Province, Algeria.

References

Communes of M'Sila Province